Jennifer C. Cornell is a Northern Ireland – American short story writer.

Life
She graduated from University of Ulster with an MA, and Cornell University with an MFA in 1994.

She teaches at Oregon State University.

Her work has appeared in New Hibernia Review, Proceedings of the Harvard Celtic Colloquium, TriQuarterly, and New England Review.

Awards
 1994 Drue Heinz Literature Prize

Works

Anthologies

References

Year of birth missing (living people)
Living people
American women short story writers
20th-century American short story writers
20th-century American women writers
21st-century American short story writers
21st-century American women writers
Alumni of Ulster University
Cornell University alumni
Oregon State University faculty
American women academics